Trezzone (  or ) is a comune (municipality) in the Province of Como in the Italian region Lombardy, located about  north of Milan and about  northeast of Como.

Trezzone borders the following municipalities: Gera Lario, Montemezzo, Vercana.

Population history

References

Cities and towns in Lombardy